Kletno Bear Cave is the longest cave located in the Śnieżnik Mountains, which are part of the greater Sudeten mountain range. It was discovered in 1966, near the village of Kletno in Poland. It is famous for its many excavations of the cave bear (Ursus spelaeus).

History

The first  of the cave was discovered in October 1966 during the mining process in the newly established quarry Kletno III. In 1967, new corridors were discovered, including the middle parts Sale pałacowe ("Palace Halls"), and, in January 1972, the lowest parts were discovered. New parts of the cave were uncovered in the years 2014 to 2015.

Geography

The cave is situated on the right side of the valley of the stream Kleśnica in the Śnieżnik Mountains, a part of the Sudetes. The cave is located at 790 m above sea level on the slopes of Góra Stroma mountain (1,166.8 m).

Fossil animal remnants

Rich bone material of Pleistocene animals was found inside the cave, including mostly mammals such as brown bear, cave lion, hyena, wolf, wild boar, and others. Bones of cave bear were dominant among the bone material, making up almost 90% of all the excavated bones.

Gallery

References

Bibliography

Praca Zbiorowa, "Jaskinia Niedźwiedzia w Kletnie. Badanie i udostępnianie", Polska Akademia Nauk, Ossolineum, Wrocław 1989, .  with  summary.
 Jaskinie Sudetów praca zbiorowa pod red. Mariana Puliny, Polskie Towarzystwo Przyjaciół Nauk o Ziemi, Warszawa 1996,  .
 Jaskinia Niedźwiedzia w Kletnie. 40 lat eksploracji, badań, ochrony i turystyki praca zbiorowa pod red. Wojciecha Ciężkowskiego, Wydawnictwo "Maria", Wrocław-Kletno 2006,  .

External links
Official website of the cave. 

Limestone caves
Show caves in Poland
Caves of Poland
Tourist attractions in Lower Silesian Voivodeship
Kłodzko County
Landforms of Lower Silesian Voivodeship